Khamyshki is a rural locality (a selo) in Dakhovskoye Rural Settlement of Maykopsky District, the Republic of Adygea, Russia. The population was 297 as of 2018. There are 22 streets.

Geography 
The village is located in the valley of the Belaya River, 57 km south of Tulsky (the district's administrative centre) by road. Dakhovskaya is the nearest rural locality.

References 

Rural localities in Maykopsky District